Kyontawa may refer to:

Kyontawa, a fictional language and tribe appearing in the 2007 sci-fi short film Food for the Gods.
Kyontawa, Ayeyarwady, Myanmar, a population centre in Myanmar (Burma).